Trimethylplatinum iodide is the organoplatinum complex with the formula [(CH3)3PtI]4.  It is a white, air-stable solid that was one of the first organometallic complexes reported.  It arises from the reaction of potassium hexachloroplatinate with methylmagnesium iodide. The complex exists as a tetramer: a cubane-type cluster with four octahedral Pt(IV) centers linked by four iodides as triply bridging ligands.

The complex undergoes diverse reactions involving cleaving Pt-I bridges.  Derived complexes include (CH3)3PtI(bipy) and (CH3)3PtI(NH3)2.  Replacement of the iodide with hydroxide gives [(CH3)3PtOH]4.

References

Organoplatinum compounds
Iodo complexes